Frank Hughes (3 September 1889 – 4 June 1974) was a Canadian long-distance runner. He competed in the marathon at the 1928 Summer Olympics.

References

1889 births
1974 deaths
Athletes (track and field) at the 1928 Summer Olympics
Canadian male long-distance runners
Canadian male marathon runners
Olympic track and field athletes of Canada
Athletes from Hamilton, Ontario